Futbol Clube Vermoim is a Campeonato Nacional women's futsal club based in Vermoim. The club won the Portuguese championship in season 2015-2016. In 2017 the team will participate in the European Women's Futsal Tournament together with the champions from Italy, Spain, Russia, Ukraine and the Netherlands.

Current squad

References

Women's futsal clubs
Futsal clubs in Portugal
Futsal clubs established in 1991
1991 establishments in Portugal